Vietnamese people (vietnamtsi) form the small immigrant community of Overseas Vietnamese in Bulgaria today, but their numbers were much higher in the 1980s. As of 2015, the Vietnamese community in Bulgaria numbers 2,600, including Bulgarian residents and/or citizens. They mainly live in the capital Sofia, but also in Plovdiv, Dimitrovgrad and Varna.
Many Vietnamese people also live in Kozloduy.

History

The Vietnamese diaspora in Bulgaria dates to the 1960s. In 1950, Bulgaria and Vietnam had established diplomatic relations and signed a mutual agreement to co-operate in cultural and educational affairs. As a result, the first Vietnamese students arrived in Bulgaria in 1960. The main subjects that the Vietnamese came to study were agriculture, economics, tourism, humanities, arts, medicine and construction.

According to an international agreement of 1980, Bulgaria, along with other Comecon members such as Poland, Czechoslovakia and the Soviet Union, accepted Vietnamese guest workers in the country as a relatively cheaper manual labour workforce. According to one estimate, over 35,000 Vietnamese people have worked in Bulgaria between 1980 and 1991, and 5,000 Vietnamese students have completed their higher education in various Bulgarian universities. Plattenbauten (панелка; panelka) and mobile home hostels were built in 1984 in the Krasna Polyana municipality of Sofia to accommodate the Vietnamese; by 1990, the area had acquired the nickname "Little Saigon". The hostels are still known as "the Vietnamese hostels" today, although their demolition has been considered by the Capital Municipality as they have since decayed into an unregulated Roma-inhabited slum.

The idea was to compensate Bulgaria's lack of sufficient manual workforce and at the same time to relieve Vietnam of some of its growing population, with the trained workers potentially coming back. In practice, however, this co-operation was subject to much corruption in Vietnam, with many members of its richest class of merchants paying bribes equivalent to around €1,000 (in 1985) to be sent to Bulgaria, where they expanded their speculative business, engaging in black market trade, production of counterfeit goods such as jeans, etc. As a consequence, shortly after the democratic changes of 1989, Bulgaria arranged the accelerated return of most of the Vietnamese workers to Vietnam, effective in 1991.

Of the thousands of Vietnamese, all but the students and those who had married in Bulgaria left. Since 1991, Bulgaria has been a target country for economic immigrants from Vietnam, as the average wages remained higher despite the country's difficulties in the 1990s. Along with the Chinese, Koreans, Arabs and other immigrants, the Vietnamese have established a presence among the vendors in Sofia's well-known and frequented bazaar Iliyantsi. The number of Vietnamese immigrants is constantly rising, although they are yet to feature more prominently in Bulgaria's social life and media.

In 2008, it was widely reported and discussed that Bulgaria, now a European Union member, is again looking to employ Vietnamese workers, as unemployment in the country has been largely solved as an issue (with unemployment rates comparable to those in France or Belgium and lower than in Spain or Germany). and on the contrary, there is a lack of workers in the rapidly developing building and tourism branches in particular. Vietnamese would be offered jobs on contract terms with temporary residence in Bulgaria.

Notable people
 Ani Hoang, singer.

See also 
Bulgaria–Vietnam relations
Immigration to Bulgaria

References

Bulgaria
Ethnic groups in Bulgaria